Unbelievable is an American true crime television miniseries starring Toni Collette, Merritt Wever, and Kaitlyn Dever. It is about a series of rapes in Washington State and Colorado. The show was co-created by Susannah Grant, Ayelet Waldman, and Michael Chabon. All three co-creators and Sarah Timberman, Carl Beverly, and Katie Couric were executive producers. It was released on September 13, 2019, on Netflix.

The miniseries is based on the 2015 news article "An Unbelievable Story of Rape", written by T. Christian Miller and Ken Armstrong, and their 2018 book A False Report based on the same research. The series received critical acclaim.

Premise
A dramatization of the 2008–2011 Washington and Colorado serial rape cases, Unbelievable follows "Marie, a teenager who was charged with lying about having been raped, and the two detectives who followed a twisting path to arrive at the truth". The program draws from "An Unbelievable Story of Rape" (2015), a Pulitzer Prize-winning article by T. Christian Miller and Ken Armstrong for ProPublica and The Marshall Project. It also draws from the related book A False Report (2018), by the same authors.

Cast and characters

Main
 Toni Collette as Det. Grace Rasmussen, a Westminster Police Department detective in Westminster, Colorado; inspired by Edna Hendershot.
 Merritt Wever as Det. Karen Duvall, a Golden Police Department detective in Golden, Colorado; inspired by Stacy Galbraith.
 Kaitlyn Dever as Marie Adler, a survivor of sexual assault.

Recurring
 Eric Lange as Det. Parker, a Lynnwood Police Department detective in Lynnwood, Washington who is assigned to Marie's case; inspired by Sergeant Jeffrey Mason
 Bill Fagerbakke as Det. Pruitt, a Lynnwood Police Department detective also assigned to Marie's case; inspired by Jerry Rittgarn
 Elizabeth Marvel as Judith, Marie's most recent foster mom
 Bridget Everett as Colleen Doggett, one of Marie's former foster moms
 Danielle Macdonald as Amber, a victim of sexual assault
 Dale Dickey as RoseMarie, a veteran detective at the Westminster Police Department
 Liza Lapira as Mia, a police surveillance expert
 Omar Maskati as Elias, RoseMarie's data analyst intern at the Westminster Police Department
 Austin Hébert as Max Duvall, Karen's husband who is a police officer at the Westminster Police Department
 Kai Lennox as Steve Rasmussen, Grace's husband who is an investigator with the Attorney General's office in Westminster, Colorado
 Blake Ellis as Chris McCarthy, the serial rapist behind the attacks; inspired by Marc Patrick O'Leary
 Aaron Staton as Curtis McCarthy, Chris's brother and a suspect; inspired by Michael O'Leary
 Patricia Fa'asua as Becca, a counselor at the Oakdale Apartments for at-risk youth
 Charlie McDermott as Ty, a counselor at the Oakdale Apartments for at-risk youth
 Brent Sexton as Al, Colleen's husband and Marie's former foster father
 Annaleigh Ashford as Lilly, a victim of sexual assault
 Scott Lawrence as Billy Taggart, an FBI special agent
 Shane Paul McGhie as Connor, Marie's ex-boyfriend
 Hendrix Yancey as Daisy, Duvall's daughter

Guest
 Nick Searcy as Detective Harkness
 Brooke Smith as Dara Kaplan, Marie's therapist
 John Billingsley as Judge Brent Gordon
 Vanessa Bell Calloway as Sarah, a victim of sexual assault
 Tom Amandes as Bruce Bronstein, Marie's lawyer

Production

Development
On January 22, 2018, Netflix ordered Unbelievable from Timberman/Beverly Productions and CBS Television Studios with executive producers including Susannah Grant, Michael Chabon, Ayelet Waldman, Sarah Timberman, Carl Beverly, and Katie Couric. The eight episode miniseries is based on an article by ProPublica and The Marshall Project, "An Unbelievable Story of Rape" written by T. Christian Miller and Ken Armstrong about a case in Lynnwood, Washington. There was also a concurrently-published This American Life radio episode about the same case, Anatomy of Doubt. Grant served as showrunner and also wrote for the series along with Michael Chabon and Ayelet Waldman.

Casting
On June 25, 2018, it was announced that Toni Collette, Merritt Wever, and Kaitlyn Dever had been cast in the series' main roles. On July 26, 2018, it was reported that Danielle Macdonald had joined the main cast. In August 2018, it was announced that Kai Lennox, Austin Hébert, Dale Dickey, Omar Maskati, Elizabeth Marvel, Liza Lapira, and Eric Lange had been cast in recurring roles. On September 26, 2018, it was reported that Vanessa Bell Calloway had joined the cast in a recurring capacity.

Episodes

Reception

Critical response
On review aggregator Rotten Tomatoes, the series holds an approval rating of 98% based on 84 reviews, with an average rating of 8.7/10. The website's critical consensus reads, "Heartbreaking and powerful, Unbelievable transcends familiar true-crime beats by shifting its gaze to survivors of abuse, telling their stories with grace and gravity." On Metacritic, it has a weighted average score of 83 out of 100, based on 25 critics, indicating "universal acclaim".

Audience viewership
On October 17, 2019, Netflix announced that the miniseries had been viewed by over 32 million viewers after its release on their platform.

Accolades

References

External links
 
 
 "An Unbelievable Story of Rape" (ProPublica)
 "An Unbelievable Story of Rape" (The Marshall Project)
 Anatomy of Doubt, episode 581 of This American Life

2010s American drama television miniseries
2019 American television series debuts
2019 American television series endings
English-language Netflix original programming
Rape in television
Television series by CBS Studios
Television shows set in Colorado
Television shows set in Washington (state)